Arthur Brooks may refer to:

Arthur C. Brooks (born 1964), American social scientist
Arthur Raymond Brooks (1895–1991), World War I flying ace
Arthur Brooks (ice hockey) (1892–1987), Canadian ice hockey player
Arthur Brooks (politician) (1936–2021), member of the Ohio House of Representatives
Arthur Brooks (singer), American soul singer and songwriter, in The Impressions
Arthur Brooks (footballer) (1891–1976), English footballer

See also
Arthur Brooke (disambiguation)